Since their major label debut in 1997, Japanese male vocal/dance unit Da Pump has released six studio albums, two compilations, one live album, one remix album and twenty six singles. Two of their albums, Beat Ball (2000) and Da Best of Da Pump (2001) have topped the Oricon album charts. The latter album is their most commercially successful album having garnered over a million in sales.

Albums

Studio albums

Compilation albums

Remix albums

Live albums

Singles

B-sides

References 

Discographies of Japanese artists
Pop music group discographies